Nuario is a corregimiento in Las Tablas District, Los Santos Province, Panama with a population of 182 as of 2010. Its population as of 1990 was 229; its population as of 2000 was 195.

References

Corregimientos of Los Santos Province